Chrysaegliodes is a genus of moths in the subfamily Arctiinae. It contains the single species Chrysaegliodes noliformis, which is found in Gabon.

References

Natural History Museum Lepidoptera generic names catalog

Endemic fauna of Gabon
Lithosiini
Fauna of Gabon
Moths of Africa